The A List is the second studio album by British-Norwegian boy band A1. The album was released on 30 October 2000, a week prior to the release of the album's second single, "Same Old Brand New You". The album charted higher than its predecessor, following the number-one charting success of the single "Take On Me". The album was certified as Gold in the UK.

Track listing

Charts and certifications

Charts

Certifications

Year-end charts

References

2000 albums
A1 (band) albums
Columbia Records albums